Bint Jbeil is the second largest town in the Nabatiye Governorate in Southern Lebanon.

The town has an estimated population of 30,000. Its exact population is unknown, because Lebanon has not conducted a population census since 1932.

History
According to E. H. Palmer, the name means "The daughter of the
mother of the little mountain".

Ottoman era

In 1596, it was named as a village, "Bint Jubayl" in the Ottoman nahiya (subdistrict) of  Tibnin  under the liwa' (district) of Safad, with a population of 238 households and 60 bachelors, all Muslim. The villagers paid taxes on  agricultural products, such as wheat, barley,  olive trees, fruit trees, goats and beehives, in addition to "occasional revenues", a press for olive oil or grape syrup, and a fixed sum; a total of 25,220 akçe.

In 1838 Edward Robinson noted it as a large Shia village, while in 1875, Victor Guérin found it to be a village with one thousand Metualis; based on archeological findings, he concluded that the village is located on the site of a former Jewish village whose name has since been forgotten.

In 1881, the PEF's Survey of Western Palestine (SWP)  described it: "A very large Metawileh village, containing about 1,100 to 1,500 Metawileh. A market is held here every Thursday. The village is well built, and has a mosque. The situation is surrounded by higher hills, though the village is on high ground. The cultivation around is grapes, olives, and arable land. Water is supplied from a spring and many cisterns and large birket."

Modern era

The town is predominately inhabited by Shia Muslims (90%), though the surrounding area also has a significant Christian (10%) minority.

With the rise of Palestinian militias in Lebanon the Lebanese army attempted to control their activities. In October 1969 the army surrounded 150 Palestinians near Bint Jbeil. In six days of fighting sixteen of them were killed.

Bint Jbeil was occupied by Israel in 1978 during Operation Litani, and again from 1982 until 2000 during the 1982-2000 South Lebanon conflict, when it was severely depopulated; as much as 75% of the population was reported to have left for other parts of Lebanon. It was the scene of occasional attacks on the Israeli military forces, such as a car bombing carried out by a Hezbollah member on 25 April 1995 which destroyed the Israeli administrative headquarters in the town. 
Almost three weeks later, 15 May, a bomb near Bint Jbeil killed six Israeli soldiers and wounded four. Hezbollah took control of the town following the Israeli withdrawal from South Lebanon.

As the largest town in the area, Bint Jbeil is sometimes known as the "Capital of the Liberated South" (among Lebanese Shi'ites). It is considered one of the centers with symbolic history for Hezbollah. Under Lebanon's complicated system of sectarian electoral representation, the Bint Jbeil electoral district is allocated 3 Shi'ite seats in the country's parliament. Hezbollah did well in the area in the 2005 elections in Lebanon, winning the local seats to add to its nationwide tally of 14.

During the 2006 Israeli offensive against Hizbollah the conquest of Bint Jbeil was one of the first objectives. At the start of the operation a Maglan reconnaissance unit was ambushed and had to be rescued by Egoz commandos. In four days of fighting seventeen Israeli soldiers were killed and most of the town destroyed (See Battle of Bint Jbeil).  On July 15, Israeli missile killed 4 civilians, aged between 60 and 85.

Reconstruction as of early 2007 had been going very slowly, leading to reports of dissatisfaction among the residents.  Iranian President Mahmoud Ahmadinejad visited the town in 2010 to show solidarity for Hezbollah and the local victims of Israel's attacks.

Notable people
Ali Ahmad Bazzi (born 1958), politician and MP
Khalid Bazzi (1969–2006), Hezbollah commander
Ahmad Zreik (born 1990), footballer

News articles
Greenberg, Hanan (25 July 2006). "IDF in control of Bint Jbeil". Ynet
Siegel, Robert (26 July 2006). "Israeli Soldiers in Stiff Fight for Village". All Things Considered.
Farrell, Stephen (27 July 2006). "Battle of Bint Jbeil shocks ground troops". Irish Independent.
Gilmore, Inigo & Beaumont, Peter (30 July 2006 ). "Israelis withdraw from Hizbollah border stronghold". The Guardian.
Blanford, Nicholas (1 August 2006). "Surveying the Damage in Bint Jbeil". Time.
"The old and sick emerge to discover only rubble". The Telegraph. 1 August 2006.
Weiss, Efrat (8 July 2006). "2 more troops killed in Bint Jbeil". Ynet.
"Report: 'Several soldiers killed after requested to take photos faking capture of Lebanese town. International Middle East Media Center. 26 October 2006.

Gallery

See also
 Southern Lebanon

References

Bibliography

External links
Survey of Western Palestine, Map 4: IAA, Wikimedia commons 
 Bent Jbayl, Localiban
Unofficial Website of Bint Jbeil 
Unofficial Website of Bint Jbeil-Arabic
Population Estimate of Bint Jbeil

Israeli–Lebanese conflict
Populated places in the Israeli security zone 1985–2000
Populated places in Bint Jbeil District
Shia Muslim communities in Lebanon